Ragasiyam 2 is a 2015 Tamil soap opera that followed its first season, Ssshhh and aired Monday to Thursday on MediaCorp Vasantham from 5 October 2015 to 24 December 2015 at 10:30PM SST for 45 episodes. The show starred Gunalan Morgan, Saravanan Ayyavoo, Soundrarajan Jeeva, Vikneswary Se, Satyamorthi, Malene and Mournha among others.

Cast
 Gunalan Morgan as Roshan 
 Saravanan Ayyavoo as Ruthra
 Soundrarajan Jeeva as Diwakar 
 Vikneswary Se as Sachitra
 Satyamorthi as Joker
 Malene as Vid
 Mournha as Akshara

References

External links 
 Vasantham Official Website
 Ragasiyam Facebook
 Vasantham Facebook
 Ragasiyam Serial Episode

Vasantham TV original programming
Tamil-language television shows in Singapore
Tamil-language crime television series
Tamil-language romance television series
Singapore Tamil dramas
2015 Tamil-language television series debuts
2015 Tamil-language television series endings
2015 Tamil-language television seasons